The Bejtul-Evel Mosque commonly known as Baitul Awal Mosque is Ahmadiyya Mosque in Tirana, Central Albania, Albania.

The Ahmadiyya Muslim Community established in Albania has been established since 1934.  The mosque was financed from the members of Ahmadiyya Muslim Community donations. 

The Bejtul Evel Mosque is one of the largest mosques in the country. It was inaugurated by the fourth head of worldwide Ahmadiyya Muslim Community, Mirza Tahir Ahmad in 1995 which makes this mosque the 1st Ahmadiyya mosque to be built in Albania. Aside the mosque, ‘Darul Falah’ mission house is also located in Tirana, capital city of Albania. The mosque has a capacity of 2,500 people. It consists of 2 white minarets.

See also
 Islam in Albania

References 

Mosques in Tirana
Mosques completed in 1995
Ahmadiyya mosques in Albania
1995 establishments in Albania